The 1997 Macau Grand Prix Formula Three was the 44th Macau Grand Prix race to be held on the streets of Macau on 16 November 1997. It was the fourteenth edition for Formula Three cars. Third place was taken by Enrique Bernoldi of the Promatecme team.

Entry list

Race results

References

External links
 The official website of the Macau Grand Prix

Macau Grand Prix
1997 in Macau sport
November 1997 sports events in Asia
Macau